Yurii Khmelnytsky (1641 – 1685(?)), younger son of the famous Ukrainian Hetman Bohdan Khmelnytsky and brother of Tymofiy Khmelnytsky, was a Zaporozhian Cossack political and military leader. Although he spent half of his adult life as a monk, he also was Hetman of Ukraine on several occasions — in 1659-1660 and 1678–1681 and starost of Hadiach, becoming one of the most well-known Ukrainian politicians of the "Ruin" period for the Cossack Hetmanate.

Biography

Hetman of Ukraine
Yuri Khmelnytsky was born in 1641 in Subotiv near Chyhyryn in central Ukraine. In 1659, the Cossack Rada elected the 17-year-old Yurii as their hetman in Bila Tserkva, replacing the deposed Ivan Vyhovsky. The young hetman faced problems: the uneasy alliance with the Tsardom of Russia and the ongoing wars against Poland–Lithuania and against the Crimean Khanate.

During the conflict against Poland–Lithuania, Yuri Khmelntsky's Cossacks were defeated near the town of Korsun, he was captured by the Poles and later pledged loyalty to king Jan II Kazimierz of Poland–Lithuania (reigned 1648-1668).

In 1659, the parliament (sejm walny) of the Polish–Lithuanian Commonwealth granted him nobility. On 24 March 1661, he became starost of Hadiach.

Yuri's perceived treason provoked a civil war within Ukraine in 1661, when the new ataman Yakym Somko led the pro-Moscow Cossacks against Yuri and his new Polish allies. At the battle near the town of Pereiaslav in the summer of 1662, Somko's Cossacks and the Russians under Grigory Romodanovsky defeated Yuri Khmelnytsky.

After the defeat, Khmelnytsky entered an alliance with the Crimean Khanate, but this resulted in little beyond massive looting and raiding of Ukrainian towns and villages by the Tatars. Thereupon, Yuri gave up his hetman title and became a monk at the Mharsky Monastery in the autumn of 1662. Between 1664 and 1667, the hetman Pavlo Teteria imprisoned him in Lviv.

Hetman of Right-bank Ukraine
After his release in 1672, he participated in a campaign against the Tatars and was captured near Uman and brought to Constantinople, where he was allowed to live in a Greek Orthodox monastery. In 1676 — after the Sultan's ally, Petro Doroshenko, surrendered to the Russians — the Porte decided to use Khmelnytsky's famous name to reinforce their claim to the Right-bank Ukraine starting the Russo-Turkish War (1676–1681).

In 1678, the Turkish army captured Chyhyryn and declared Yuri Khmelnytsky as a new hetman of Ukraine, although in reality he was only a puppet for the Ottoman Sultan. Ottoman Turkish army with  Yuri in tow captured and burned down Kaniv and other Ukrainian towns. He then retired to his Sultan dictated capital at Nemyriv in Turkish occupied parts of Ukraine, as a vassal of sultan Mehmed IV until 1681, when the Turks removed him from power due to his unstable mental health and unprecedented cruelty. Two years later, he was briefly re-instated by the Poles. In 1685 it was reported that the Turks captured Yuri and executed him (strangled) in Kamianets-Podilskyi, which became the subject of hearsay. However, later researchers denounced this version as "apocryphal", based on one witness account, and noted other possibilities. Georgiy Konyssky, an 18th century Ukrainian author and religious figure, wrote on Yurii being taken to Istanbul, before eventual exile to a monastery somewhere in the Mediterranean. One of the possible locations is Malta, where a "Cossack general's" grave is being shown as a tourist attraction.

See also
 Hetmans of Ukrainian Cossacks
 List of Ukrainian rulers

Notes

External links
 Kostomarov, Mykola. "The Ruin: A Historical Monograph on the Life of Little Russia from 1663 to 1687" and "Rus’ History in the Biographies of Its Important Figures" - in Russian.

1641 births
1685 deaths
People from Cherkasy Oblast
Hetmans of Zaporizhian Host
Russian people of the Russo-Polish War (1654–1667)
Executed Ukrainian people
National University of Kyiv-Mohyla Academy alumni
17th-century executions by the Ottoman Empire
Ukrainian people executed abroad
People executed by strangulation